Santiago Giraldo Salazar (born 27 November 1987) is a retired Colombian professional tennis player. He played on the ATP tour and represented Colombia in the Davis Cup competition. His best tournament result is reaching the final in the 2014 Barcelona Open Banc Sabadell. He is the highest-ranked tennis singles player in Colombia's history, with a career-high singles ranking of 28th in the world, and 77th in doubles.

Throughout his career he has beaten several ex-number-one players such as Lleyton Hewitt, Juan Carlos Ferrero, and Andy Murray as well as some top-ten players such as Jo-Wilfried Tsonga, Kei Nishikori, Marin Cilic, Milos Raonic, Dominic Thiem, Gilles Simon, Jürgen Melzer, Rainer Schüttler, Tommy Robredo, Janko Tipsarević, and Nicolás Lapentti. He has beaten golden-generation players from Argentinian tennis such as Gastón Gaudio, Guillermo Cañas, Mariano Puerta, Juan Martin del Potro, and David Nalbandian.

Professional career
In October 2003, at age 15, Giraldo became the youngest player in his country to be ranked by the ATP, getting his first point with the ITF Futures tournament in Medellín. In 2005, he won his first professional tournament in Medellín, and a 15,000 dollar prize, in the ITF Futures category. In 2006, age 18, he won the Challenger de Bogotá title and reached the Challenger de Medellín final.

In March 2007, Giraldo won the Challenger de Bogotá title, beating the Brazilian Flávio Saretta, and won the Challenger de Quite against Giovanni Lapentti. He reached two finals in the same Challenger category. Although he lost to the Spanish Fernando Vicente in the Challenger de San Luis Potosí, he was close to the Top-100, reaching position 115, and also entered the Roland Garros' main draw as a "lucky loser". In October of the same year, he reached the Challenger de Bogotá final, losing to Marcos Daniel. His only ATP triumph in 2007 was beating the Venezuelan Yohny Romero in the Davis Cup, helping Colombia win the series, 3-1, against Venezuela.

During 2008, Giraldo had a 19-17 record in Challenger tournaments, he made it to the final at Challenger de Furth's final, losing to Daniel Köllerer, and to Challenger de Cali's semifinals. He made it to final draws five times, including the ATP World Tour Masters 1000 tournaments at Indian Wells and Miami. For the second consecutive year, he made Roland Garros' main draw, losing in the first round to Florent Serra.

Giraldo opened 2009 by winning the Challenger de Salinas title, defeating Michael Rusell in the final, and, in March, had his sole triumph at the ATP level in the Davis Cup match versus Uruguay. Giraldo then qualified for the Indian Wells-Masters 1000's main draw and lost in the first round to Nicolás Lapentti. One month later, Giraldo won the Challenger de San Luis Potosí's title against the Italian Paolo Lorenzi. For the third consecutive year, Giraldo entered the Roland Garros' main draw, losing to Denis Istomin in five sets in the first round. In the final stretch of the season, Giraldo won 19 out of 26 matches, reaching the Challenger de Cali and Quito semifinals and winning the Sacramento title (defeating Canadian Jesse Levine in the finals) but losing again to Nicolas Lapentti in Guayaquil's final. Giraldo qualified for the Australian Open main draw for the first time by virtue of his previous results. He won US$96,412 during 2009 and finished his best year out of the top-100 (105), with three Challenger titles and a 38-14 record.

At the 2010 Australian Open, Giraldo beat off-seed No. 16 Tommy Robredo (6–4, 6–2, 6–2) in the first round. However, he lost in the second round to Łukasz Kubot (4–6, 6–3, 3–6, 1–6). At the 2010 Internazionali BNL d'Italia in Rome, a Masters 1000 event, he produced a heavy ground game to crush 12th seed Juan Carlos Ferrero (6–0, 6–3) in the first round, followed by a 6–3, 6–2 win over Michaël Llodra in the second round. However his run was ended at the hands of World No. 10 and 7th seed Jo-Wilfried Tsonga (3–6, 4–6) in the third round.

At the 2011 Heineken Open in Auckland, New Zealand, Giraldo made it to the semi-finals, where he lost to David Ferrer (3–6, 5–7). At the 2011 Australian Open, he reached the second round where he lost to Marin Čilić (3–6, 6–7, 1–6). He reached the final of the 2011 Movistar Open where he lost to Tommy Robredo (2–6, 6–2, 6–7) despite serving for the championship at 5–3. At the 2011 US Open, Giraldo drew World No. 3 Roger Federer in the first round, to whom he lost in straight sets (4–6, 3–6, 2–6).

At the 2013 French Open Giraldo lost in the first round to Grega Zemlja (4–6, 1–6, 4–6).

In the first round of 2014 Heineken Open, Giraldo beat Spaniard Albert Montañés in straight sets (6-1, 7-6). His tournament ended in the second round, losing in a 3-setter against Guillermo García-López (7-6(7), 2-6, 3-6). He beat Marcel Granollers and Guillermo Garcia-Lopez at Viña del Mar to reach the semi-finals, where he was defeated by Leonardo Mayer. He upset Tommy Robredo at the 2014 U.S. Men's Clay Court Championships and reached the semi-finals, where he lost to Fernando Verdasco.

At the 2014 Barcelona Open Banc Sabadell, he reached his second ATP final, and the first one in an ATP World Tour 500 series tournament. On the way, he defeated 3rd-seeded Fabio Fognini, 10th-seeded Philipp Kohlschreiber and 6th-seeded Nicolas Almagro. He lost the tournament against Kei Nishikori in straight sets (2-6, 2-6).

In May 2014, in the second round of the 2014 Mutua Madrid Open Giraldo beat 11th-seeded Frenchman Jo-Wilfried Tsonga in straight sets (6-4, 6-3). Then he achieved his first win against a top-10 player, defeating the World No. 8 and two-time Grand Slam champion Andy Murray in straight sets (6-3, 6-2). He advanced to the quarterfinals but lost to Roberto Bautista-Agut.

At the 2014 Wimbledon tournament, Giraldo defeated Marcel Granollers in the second round and lost to Roger Federer in the third round. At Washington he was defeated by Vasek Pospisil in the quarter-finals. At the US Open he was beaten by Teymuraz Gabashvili in the first round. He reached the semi-finals at Shenzhen, where he lost to Tommy Robredo.

In 2016, Giraldo lost to 32nd-seed Joao Sousa in the second round of the 2016 Australian Open. Giraldo lost in the first round of the 2016 French Open. Giraldo lost in the first round of 2016 Wimbledon Championships to Gilles Muller, in a match that went to 5 sets, Muller eventually prevailing, 15-13, in the last set. Giraldo won the Advantage Cars Prague Open, which included an impressive win in the quarter-finals against world number-26 Martin Klizan. Giraldo entered the new 2016 Los Cabos Open tournament. He beat Amir Weintraub in straight sets, then faced 4th seed Sam Querrey, whom he defeated in straight sets. He lost to wild-card Pablo Carreño Busta in the quarterfinals.

Playing style
Giraldo has a powerful forehand stroke—with a big backswing and a forward swing that contacts the ball with extreme speed, flattening it out—that he uses to move his opponents around and end points quickly. His forehand has been likened to that of Fernando González, his coach. Giraldo also uses this technique to hit balls out wide at an acute angle, which is a signature shot of his. While his backhand is generally his weaker shot in terms of pace, he uses an identical technique, which makes his backhand flat and low. He is known for his flair in shot-making with both his forehand and backhand, often hitting balls with extreme pace or angles. His best shot is the running forehand.

Giraldo has a powerful return of serve. Unlike traditional good returners such as Andy Murray, Novak Djokovic, and Andre Agassi, who use anticipation and footwork to take serves early and efficiently, Giraldo stands further behind the baseline—especially on second serves—winds up a huge backswing, and takes the ball later, injecting a sudden increase in pace. He is also adept at controlling serves, such that he can hit them at acute angles with speed to finish off the point early. Giraldo's serve is not one of his strengths, but he possesses a decent flat and strong first serve and a top-spin second serve.

Giraldo's weaknesses include inconsistency and lack of agility. Because of his shot-making and hyper-aggressive style of play, he is more than prone to making unforced errors on his groundstroke rallies, more often than on his returns of serve. Because he often goes for hard, flat shots, he hits the ball into the net more often than other players. His playing style relies on dictating points and winning quickly, so he is affected by quick counter-punchers who can move him around and return his shots consistently, such as David Ferrer, Andy Murray, Novak Djokovic, and Rafael Nadal. Giraldo occasionally exhibits clumsy footwork as well, and sometimes is simply not fast enough to retrieve directed or drop shots.

ATP career finals

Singles: 2 (2 runner-ups)

Doubles: 1 (1 runner-up)

ATP Challenger and ITF Futures finals

Singles: 18 (13–5)

Doubles: 7 (3–4)

Performance timelines

Singles

Doubles
This table is current through Australian Open 2016.

Wins over top 10 players

Personal life
In 2014, Giraldo had a relationship with Romanian tennis player Sorana Cîrstea, which ended in the summer of 2017.

References

External links

Colombian male tennis players
Sportspeople from Bogotá
People from Pereira, Colombia
1987 births
Living people
Tennis players at the 2012 Summer Olympics
Olympic tennis players of Colombia
Tennis players at the 2019 Pan American Games
Pan American Games competitors for Colombia